Meng Man (born 28 January 1975) is a Chinese scholar and a professor at the College of History and Culture, Minzu University of China. She is best known for conducting lecture series about Chinese literature on the CCTV-10 television programme Lecture Room.

Biography
Meng was born in 1975 in Pingquan, Chengde, Hebei province, to an ethnic Manchu family. Her parents graduated from Tianjin Foreign Studies University. Her elder aunt was a university student in the 1950s and became the first headmistress in her hometown.

She entered the Minzu University of China in September 1992, majoring in history, where she graduated in July 1999. Two months later, she was accepted to Peking University, where she completed her doctor's degree in history under the direction of Rong Xinjiang. After graduation, she taught there.

In November 2007, she regularly gave lectures on Wu Zetian on the television programme Lecture Room shown on CCTV-10. Since then, she has conducted four lecture series–Wu Zetian, Princess Taiping (2008), The Song of Everlasting Sorrow (2009), The Wonderful Sui Dynasty (2010) and Emperor Xuanzong and Yang Guifei (2013).

In January 2017, she became a judge at the CCTV program Chinese Poetry Congress. On June 23, she was elected a delegate to the 19th National Congress of the Communist Party of China.

Works

References

External links
 Meng Man on Sinaweibo 

1975 births
People from Chengde
Living people
Peking University alumni
Minzu University of China alumni
Academic staff of Minzu University of China
Educators from Hebei
Writers from Hebei
All-China Women's Federation people